Aviya may refer to:
Aviya, a form of the first name Abijah
Aviya Kopelman (b. 1978), Israeli classical composer